Steven Kozola (born December 17, 1989) is an American mixed martial artist who most recently competed in Bellator's Lightweight division. A professional competitor since 2013, he has also competed for the World Series of Fighting.

Mixed martial arts career

Early career
Kozola started his professional career in July 2013. He went undefeated in his first four bouts, stopping all of his opponents, before signing with Bellator MMA. He competed for a variety of promotions during this time, including Gladiator Challenge and Xplode Fight Series and World Series of fighting.

Bellator MMA
In his promotional debut for Bellator, Kozola was paired with Jonathan Rivera at Bellator 132 on January 16, 2015. Kozola won the fight via knockout in the second round.

In his second fight for the promotion, Kozola faced Ian Butler at Bellator 137 on May 15, 2015. Kozola once again won via knockout, this time in the first round, improving his undefeated record to 6–0.

After a successful debut in the World Series of Fighting, Kozola returned to Bellator against Jake Roberts at Bellator 175 on March 31, 2017. He won the fight via TKO, just 28 seconds into the first round.

Kozola faced Carrington Banks at Bellator 184 on October 6, 2017. He lost the fight via unanimous decision.

Kozola faced Jake Smith at Bellator 193 on January 26, 2018. He lost the fight via knockout early in the first round due to two right hands from Smith, followed by ground-and-pound that secured the stoppage. Kozola was subsequently released from the promotion.

Despite his release from Bellator, Kozola returned to the promotion and faced Ryan Walker at Bellator 202 on July 13, 2018. He won the fight via TKO in the first round.

Mixed martial arts record

|-
| Loss
| align=center|9–4
| Salvador Becerra
| Decision (unanimous)
| LFA 74
| 
| align=center|3
| align=center|5:00
| Riverside, California, United States
|
|-
| Loss
| align=center|9–3
| Arthur Estrázulas
| Submission (rear-naked choke)
| LFA 69
| 
| align=center|1
| align=center|2:32
| Cabazon, California, United States
|
|-
| Win
| align=center|9–2
| Ryan Walker
| TKO (punches)
| Bellator 202
| 
| align=center| 1
| align=center| 1:45
| Thackerville, Oklahoma, United States
| 
|-
| Loss
| align=center|8–2
| Jake Smith
| KO (punches)
| Bellator 193
| 
| align=center| 1
| align=center| 0:57
| Temecula, California, United States
| 
|-
| Loss
| align=center|8–1
| Carrington Banks
| Decision (unanimous)
| Bellator 184
| 
| align=center| 3
| align=center| 5:00
| Thackerville, Oklahoma, United States
| 
|-
|Win
|align=center|8–0
|Jake Roberts
|TKO (punches)
|Bellator 175
|
|align=center|1
|align=center|0:28
|Rosemont, Illinois, United States
|
|-
|Win
|align=center|7–0
|Matt Church
|TKO (punches)
|WSOF 30
|
|align=center|1
|align=center|1:57
|Las Vegas, Nevada, United States
|160 lb Catchweight bout.
|-
|Win
|align=center|6–0
|Ian Butler
|KO (punches)
|Bellator 137
|
|align=center|1
|align=center|2:22
|Temecula, California, United States
|
|-
|Win
|align=center|5–0
|Jonathan Rivera
|KO (punches)
|Bellator 132
|
|align=center|2
|align=center|1:25
|Temecula, California, United States
|
|-
|Win
|align=center|4–0
|Danny Morales Jr.
|KO (strikes)
|American Predator Fighting Championships 17
|
|align=center|1
|align=center|1:56
|Hoffman Estates, Illinois, United States
|Return to Lightweight.
|-
|Win
|align=center|3–0
|Eddy Gonzalez
|TKO (punches)
|Gladiator Challenge: Backlash
|
|align=center|1
|align=center|0:50
|El Cajon, California, United States
|Welterweight bout.
|-
|Win
|align=center|2–0
|Tommy Gavin
|TKO (punches)
|BAMMA USA: Badbeat 12
|
|align=center|2
|align=center|0:44
|Commerce, California, United States
|
|-
|Win
|align=center|1–0
|Ramon Hernandez
|Submission (guillotine choke)
|Xplode Fight Series: Aftermath
|
|align=center|2
|align=center|1:29
|Valley Center, California, United States
|

See also
 List of current Bellator fighters

References

Living people
1989 births
American male mixed martial artists
Lightweight mixed martial artists
Mixed martial artists utilizing taekwondo
Mixed martial artists utilizing Brazilian jiu-jitsu
American male taekwondo practitioners
American practitioners of Brazilian jiu-jitsu
Sportspeople from Naperville, Illinois
Mixed martial artists from Illinois